Konstantin Vasilyevich Shchegotsky (April 13, 1911 – January 23, 1989) was a Soviet football player and coach from Moscow.

Playing career
From 1927 to 1929, at the age of 16, Shchegotsky played for Gornyak Moscow, which represented a mining institute. In 1930, he joined Tryokhgorka Moscow with which he won gold medals of Moscow city championship. In 1931-32, Shchegotsky played for Automobile Moscow Society and the collective team of Moscow city.

In 1933, at 21 years of age, Shchegotsky joined Dynamo Kyiv, where he remained until World War II. During that period, he also represented the national team of the Ukrainian SSR. In 1935, at the Kyiv city championship, Shchegotsky appeared for the Border and Internal Security Administration and for the Soviet Union national team in several unofficial games. In 1937, Shchegotsky played a game for Spartak Moscow against visiting Basque team.

In August 1938, Shchegotsky was arrested and spent over a year in prison. After his release, Shchegotsky moved to Moscow for rehabilitation and in 1940 returned to play for Dynamo Kyiv. During World War II, Shchegotsky was in the Soviet partisan movement.

References

External links
 

1911 births
1989 deaths
Footballers from Moscow
People from Moscow Governorate
Soviet Top League players
FC Dynamo Kyiv players
FC Torpedo Moscow players
FC Spartak Moscow players
FC Chornomorets Odesa players
FC Chornomorets Odesa managers
FC Dynamo Kyiv managers
NK Veres Rivne managers
FC Nyva Vinnytsia managers
FC Shakhtar Donetsk managers
MFC Mykolaiv managers
Soviet football managers
Soviet footballers
Russian footballers
Ukrainian footballers
Inmates of Lukyanivska Prison
Prisoners and detainees of the Soviet Union
Association football forwards